{{Speciesbox
|name = 
|image = Hovea heterophylla (6069084538).jpg
|genus = Hovea
|species = heterophylla
|authority = A.Cunn. ex Hook.f.
|synonyms_ref = 
|synonyms = {{collapsible list |
 Hovea heterophylla f. decipiens' Domin p.p.
 Hovea heterophylla A.Cunn. ex Hook.f. f. heterophylla 
 Hovea heterophylla f. typica Domin nom. inval.
 Hovea linearis (Sm.) R.Br. p.p.
 Hovea linearis auct. non (Sm.) R.Br.: Ross, J.H. in Walsh, N.G. & Entwisle, T.J. (ed.)
 Hovea linearis auct. non (Sm.) R.Br.: Buchanan, A.M. in Buchanan, A.M. (ed.) (1999)
}}
}}
 Hovea heterophylla, commonly known as creeping hovea''', is a small shrub with linear leaves and purple-violet pea flowers.  It is found in all states other than Western Australia.

The leaf margins rolled under to curved, hooked at the apex, upper surface hairless, smooth, net-like veins, under surface paler with flattened, dense hairs.

Taxonomy and namingHovea heterophylla was first formally described in 1855 by Joseph Dalton Hooker from an unpublished description by Allan Cunningham in The botany of the Antarctic voyage of H.M. Discovery ships Erebus and Terror. III. Flora Tasmaniae. The specific epithet (heterophylla)'' means "different leaved".

Distribution and habitat
Creeping hovea is a common and widespread species growing in grassy woodland and montane forests on coasts and ranges in New South Wales. It occurs in all states other than Western Australia.

References

heterophylla
Flora of New South Wales
Flora of Queensland
Flora of South Australia
Flora of Tasmania
Flora of Victoria (Australia)
Fabales of Australia
Plants described in 1855